John McLauchlan  (born 14 April 1942), known as Ian McLauchlan, is a former Scotland international rugby union player. Nicknamed Mighty Mouse, he represented Scotland at loosehead prop from 1969 to 1979.

Rugby union career

Amateur career
He played for Jordanhill and West of Scotland.

His scrummaging and loose play were both of a high standard. Fellow West of Scotland and Scotland international player Gordon Brown rated him the best prop he had played alongside.

His nickname "Mighty Mouse" was from the fact that he was relatively small for a prop, but powerful for his size, like the cartoon character of the same name:

"Like McLeod, Ian McLauchlan was short and about as broad as a church door... There was always something a bit odd about his figure even before he acquired a certain rotundity that made him more like a French than a British prop. But nobody found him easy to prop against: he burrowed under the opposition."

Provincial career
He played for Glasgow District.

International career
He was capped 43 times for Scotland, and was captain of the national side nineteen times (ten times of which Scotland won).

He had to wait until second half of his twenties for a cap, and played for another ten years, before being dropped in 1979.

He became a Scotland captain, and even led them in the Calcutta Cup match of 1973, despite breaking a bone in his leg two weeks before against , according to Massie "it says much for the persuasive power of his character that he convinced the selectors he was able to play."

Richard Bath writes:
"Certainly, McLauchlan was not the conventional size and shape for a loose-head prop in the 1970s, but in many ways it was precisely the combination of an amazing power to weight ratio plus his ability to get under the opposing tight-head that made him such an effective performer in the tight... As a larger than life character, he played best in the most intimidating circumstances... making him one of Scotland's most successful captains. After his retirement the Scottish Rugby Union showed their gratitude by banning him for publishing his autobiography".

On the Lions tour to New Zealand in 1971 he played in all four tests after Irish prop Ray McLaughlin broke his thumb punching Alex Wyllie in the notorious Battle of Canterbury the week before the first test.

He played in eight tests for the British Lions on the 1971 tour to New Zealand and the 1974 tour to South Africa, only once finishing on the losing side.

Administrative career
McLauchlan became the 122nd President of the Scottish Rugby Union. He served two years from 2010 to 2012.

References

Sources

 Bath, Richard (ed.) The Complete Book of Rugby (Seven Oaks Ltd, 1997 )
 Massie, Allan A Portrait of Scottish Rugby (Polygon, Edinburgh)

1942 births
Living people
British & Irish Lions rugby union players from Scotland
Glasgow District (rugby union) players
Jordanhill RFC players
Officers of the Order of the British Empire
Presidents of the Scottish Rugby Union
Rugby union players from South Ayrshire
Rugby union props
Scotland international rugby union players
Scottish rugby union players
West of Scotland FC players